HMS Dianthus was a  of the Royal Navy. She was launched on 9 July 1940 from the Leith Docks on the Firth of Forth and named after the genus of flowering plants including Carnation, Pink, and Sweet William.  The ship escorted trade convoys between Newfoundland and the Western Approaches through the Battle of the Atlantic wolf pack attacks of the winter of 1942–43.

Background

Flower-class corvettes like Dianthus serving with the Royal Navy during World War II were different to earlier and more traditional sail-driven corvettes.  The "corvette" designation was created by the French in the 19th century as a class of small warships; the Royal Navy borrowed the term for a period but discontinued its use in 1877. During the hurried preparations for war in the late 1930s, Winston Churchill reactivated the corvette class, needing a name for smaller ships used in an escort capacity, in this case based on a whaling ship design. The generic name "flower" was used to designate the class of these ships, which – in the Royal Navy – were named after flowering plants.

War duty

Dianthus spent 1941 escorting trade convoys through coastal waters and the Western Approaches to the United Kingdom until assigned to Mid-Ocean Escort Force (MOEF) group C1.  Dianthus rammed and sank U-379 while defending convoy SC 94.  Dianthus was assigned to MOEF group A3 after yard overhaul to repair damage from the ramming collision.  With group A3, she participated in the battles of convoys ON 145, ON 166, SC 121 and HX 233.  When group A3 disbanded, Dianthus was assigned to MOEF group C5 until another yard overhaul in August 1943.  Dianthus completed refit in November and escorted four more trans-Atlantic convoys in two round trips before being returned to European coastal escort work for the remainder of the war.  The ship was decommissioned and sold for civilian use following the end of hostilities.  She became the Norwegian buoy tender Thorslep, and was later used for whaling before being scrapped in 1969.

Trans-Atlantic convoys escorted: winter of 1942–43

See also
Wolf pack

Notes and references

Notes

Bibliography

External links

 

1940 ships
Flower-class corvettes of the Royal Navy
Ships built in Leith